Confetti Institute of Creative Technologies is a specialist education provider with courses in Games, Film & TV, Media, Events, Esports, and Music. It offers both college and degree level courses, and is part of Nottingham Trent University and Nottingham's Confetti Media Group. Their Creative Quarter campus is home to modern creative media technology, studios and equipment, industry-connected tutors and over 2,000 students. Many of their graduates go onto careers in music, gaming, TV, film, live events, graphic design and other creative fields.

Confetti offers courses at varying levels to suit a range of academic abilities, but what unites students and tutors is their passion for creative technologies. Students are provided with the skills, experience and industry links to help turn their passion into real job options.

History 
Confetti Institute was founded in 1994. It was originally called Confetti Studios.

In 2013, Confetti Institute was visited by Prince Harry.

In 2018, the institute opened its new Digital Media Hub, and music venue Metronome, both in the Creative Quarter.

In 2022, Confetti X, an Esports venue and complex, is set to open. The institution also played host to the opening stages of the inaugural Commonwealth Esports Championships.

Partnerships 
Confetti is part of the Confetti Media Group which is a family of businesses based in Nottingham committed to driving new approaches to education and creative industries. The businesses include: Antenna, Constellations, Spool, Notts TV, Metronome, and Confetti X. 

Confetti has a wealth of carefully created relationships and connections within the creative industries - in Nottingham and further afield. Some are ‘formal’ – from education provider Access Creative, our partner in further education delivery, to our parent company Nottingham Trent University.

Confetti's local partners include Notts TV, the Nottingham Poetry Festival, BBC Introducing, NUSIC,  Hockley Hustle, Splendour Festival, the Young Creative Awards, as well as national – Screen Skills, Bafta, Channel 4, The British Games Institute and Creative England.  But all exist to generate opportunities for students and to create entry routes and give competitive advantage when pursuing careers.

All Confetti's degrees are validated by Nottingham Trent University

References

Education in Nottingham
Further education colleges in Nottinghamshire
Nottingham Trent University
1994 establishments in England
Educational institutions established in 1994